The William Bryant Octagon House is an historic octagon house located at 2 Spring Street in Stoneham, Massachusetts.  Built in 1850, it is the best-preserved of three such houses built in the town in the 1850s.  It was listed on the National Register of Historic Places in 1984.

Description and history
The William Bryant Octagon House stands east of Stoneham's Central Square, at the northwest corner of Spring and Washington Streets.  The setting is residential, but Washington Street is a busy artery, and the house stands just northeast of its junction with Pleasant Street, another artery.  It is a two-story eight-sided structure, covered by a low-pitch hip roof with a central octagonal cupola.  The walls are finished in wooden clapboards, and the house rests on a granite foundation.  The roof has extended eaves studded with decorative brackets.  The entry, set in the south-facing front facade, is sheltered by an open porch with decorative square posts and brackets, and there is a two-story addition projecting from the rear side of the house.  The other faces of the build have sash windows set in simple molded frames on each floor.

The house was built in 1850 by the Worcester Bros. firm for William Bryant, Jr., a shoecutter, and Lucinda A. (Hook) Bryant, his wife.  It is one of three octagon houses built in Stoneham during the 1850s, and is the best preserved.  Octagon houses were promoted by Orson Squire Fowler, and were an architectural fad during the 1850s.

See also
List of octagon houses
National Register of Historic Places listings in Stoneham, Massachusetts
National Register of Historic Places listings in Middlesex County, Massachusetts

References

Houses on the National Register of Historic Places in Stoneham, Massachusetts
Houses in Stoneham, Massachusetts
Octagon houses in Massachusetts
Houses completed in 1850
1850 establishments in Massachusetts